Innis may refer to:

Places
 Innis, Louisiana, U.S.
 Innis College, University of Toronto, Canada

People

Surname
 Harold Innis (1894–1952), Canadian political economy professor who wrote on communication
 Hubert Van Innis (1866–1961), Belgian Olympic archer
 Jeff Innis (1962-2022), American pitcher in Major League Baseball
 Niger Innis, American activist and politician, National Spokesperson for the Congress of Racial Equality
 Roy Innis (1934–2017), American activist and politician, National Chairman of the Congress of Racial Equality
 William T. Innis (1826–1901), American politician and farmer

Given name
 Innis Green, Jacksonian Democrat member of the U.S. House of Representatives from Pennsylvania
 Innis N. Palmer (1824–1900), American Civil War major general
 Innis Palmer Swift (1882–1953), World War II major general and Innis N. Palmer's grandson

See also

 
 INIS (disambiguation)
 Innes (disambiguation)
 Ennis (disambiguation)
 Ennes (disambiguation)